The R596 road is a regional road in County Cork, Ireland. It travels from the R595 road at Skibbereen to Castletownshend.

References

Regional roads in the Republic of Ireland
Roads in County Cork